Olde Kensington, also known as South Kensington, is a neighborhood located in North Philadelphia section of Philadelphia, Pennsylvania. Olde Kensington is north of Northern Liberties, south of Norris Square, east of Ludlow, and west of Fishtown. The boundaries of the neighborhood are roughly between Cecil B Moore Ave (north), Girard Ave (south), Front St (east) and 5th St. (west).

After World War II, many neighborhoods in Philadelphia experienced a long period of decline, deindustrialization, and residential abandonment. In recent years, however, Olde Kensington has been increasingly gentrified,  following a similar pattern observed in adjacent Northern Liberties and Fishtown.  Although some industrial activity has continued along the American Street Corridor, a historic location for heavy industry, a growing number of formerly vacant factories are being turned into lofts, condos, and artistic workspaces.

The zip code for the area is 19122. Also, there are two associations that serve the neighborhood: the Kensington South Neighborhood Advisory Council (KSNAC) and Olde Kensington Neighbors Association (OKNA). KSNAC's community meeting is on every 1st Monday of each month.

Population
As of 2021, Olde Kensington was 57% non Hispanic white, 25% Hispanic, 8% non Hispanic black, 7% Asian, and 3% other. Median household income is $117,904.

Public Transportation

SEPTA provides various options of public transportation for the neighborhood, and Center City is about 2 miles or 10 minutes away. The neighborhood is served by:
	Buses 57, 5
Elevated Train (the EL) at Girard Station
Trolley 15 through Girard Ave
Also, buses 3 and 47 pass nearby the neighborhood, and the EL Berks Station and SEPTA rail at Temple University Station are within reasonable walking distance.

Additionally, many residents ride their bicycles as their preferred mode of transportation.  Indego Philly has a bike share station at 3rd & Girard and multiple peripheral stations: 2nd & Germantown Ave, 1176 Leopard Ave. (Girard Station, MFL), 1424 Frankford Ave. (City Fitness), 1902 N. Front St. (Berks Station, MFL), and 527 W. Berks St.

PhillyCarShare (now known as Enterprise CarShare) vehicles are available at 6th & Girard Ave, 100 W. Oxford St. and Frankford & Thompson St.  Zipcars are located at Front & Master, Frankford & Master, Frankford & Palmer, and 6th & Girard.

References

Neighborhoods in Philadelphia
Irish-American neighborhoods
Upper North Philadelphia
Kensington, Philadelphia